Damien Anthony Duff (born 2 March 1979) is an Irish professional football manager and former player who played predominantly as a winger. He has been the manager of League of Ireland club Shelbourne F.C. since November 2021.

He began his professional playing career with Blackburn Rovers, with whom he won the Football League Cup, and in 2003 was signed for £17 million by Chelsea, where he won two Premier League titles and another League Cup. After three seasons at Stamford Bridge, he left for Newcastle United where he won the 2006 UEFA Intertoto Cup, and then moved on to Fulham, with whom he played in the 2010 UEFA Europa League Final. He ended his career with brief spells in the A-League with Melbourne City and the League of Ireland with Shamrock Rovers before retiring in December 2015. Since then, he has moved into coaching, working with Shamrock Rovers, Celtic and Republic of Ireland youth teams.

Duff played international football for the Republic of Ireland for 14 years, winning 100 caps between 1998 and 2012. He played at the 2002 FIFA World Cup and captained the country at UEFA Euro 2012.

Club career

Blackburn Rovers 
Duff joined Blackburn Rovers as a trainee in 1996 after playing for Leicester Celtic, Lourdes Celtic and St. Kevin's Boys as a schoolboy in Dublin. He made his Blackburn debut at the age of 18 against Leicester City on the final day of the 1996–97 season for which he won the Man of the match award. In his first full season, he scored five goals. Blackburn were relegated the following season.

Duff helped Blackburn achieve promotion back to the Premier League in 2001 and then win the League Cup in 2002, beating Tottenham Hotspur 2–1 at the Millennium Stadium in a season where he was Player of the Year. Following the 2002 World Cup, Duff signed a new four-year contract with Rovers. Despite injury problems in the 2002–03 season, he finished as Blackburn's top goalscorer with 11 goals, which helped his team finish sixth and qualify for the UEFA Cup.

Chelsea
In the run up to the 2003–04 season, Chelsea made a series of bids for Duff, with a £17 million offer, eventually triggering a release clause in the player's contract. Duff chose to move to West London in July. Signed by manager Claudio Ranieri as part of the development of Chelsea financed by new owner Roman Abramovich, Duff made his debut in August 2003 in the Champions League against Slovakian side MŠK Žilina. Chelsea won 2–0 and Duff was described as the "star of the show". He scored his first Chelsea goal on 20 September 2003 in a 5–0 away win against Wolverhampton Wanderers. Duff scored the third Chelsea goal and was named as Man of the match. Duff played 23 games in all competitions for Chelsea in the 2003–04 season scoring five goals. He missed the Champions League semi-finals as Chelsea lost to AS Monaco but was instrumental in securing for Chelsea second place in the Premier League, the club's highest league finish for 49 years as well as being part of the Champions League run, but the season ultimately ended trophyless and with the sacking of manager Claudio Ranieri.

The arrival of Dutch winger Arjen Robben and new manager José Mourinho posed a threat to Duff's place in the starting line-up for the 2004–05 season, but an injury to Robben at the start of the season saw Duff as the only available winger. Mourinho, however, did not play Duff in the early part of the 2004–05 season, preferring a more narrow approach. Duff eventually got into the side after four games and, when Robben returned to the side, Duff's versatility saw him move to the right wing and form a wing partnership with Robben. The season proved to be successful for both Duff and Chelsea. He scored ten goals, including a crucial strike in a 4–2 win against Barcelona in the Champions League, while the team won the Premier League title by 12 points from second placed Arsenal, and the League Cup, in which Duff scored the winning goal in the semi-final against Manchester United. He scored three goals in 28 league appearances in the following season as the club retained their Premier League title.

Newcastle United
In July 2006, Duff agreed terms over a £5 million move to Newcastle United, signing a five-year contract. Duff made his competitive debut in a UEFA Cup second round qualifying first leg match against Latvian side Ventspils on 10 August 2006. He scored his first goal for Newcastle in September that year in a 2–0 victory over West Ham United away at the Boleyn Ground. Duff suffered a knee injury in November that kept him out for four months, during which Newcastle had a bad run of defeats. He returned but was then ruled out for the rest of the season due to an ankle injury in a 2–1 loss to Portsmouth in April 2007. Sam Allardyce later described Duff's injury as 'career threatening'. During Alan Shearer's short stint as interim manager, Duff was asked to play as left back.

In the final match of the 2008–09 season, against Aston Villa in a crucial relegation decider, Duff unluckily scored the deciding own goal by deflecting in a 20-yard shot by Villa's Gareth Barry which sent Newcastle down. Duff confirmed his intention to stay at the relegated club and help them back into the Premier League. On 8 August 2009, Duff scored Newcastle's first goal of the 2009–10 season in a 1–1 draw against West Bromwich Albion.

Fulham

After playing one game for Newcastle in 2009–10, Duff returned to the Premier League, signing for Fulham on a three-year contract for £4 million, and re-joining Roy Hodgson, his first manager at Blackburn Rovers. He made his Fulham debut coming on as a substitute against Amkar Perm in the Cottagers' UEFA Europa League qualifier match, setting up the third goal in a 3–1 win. Duff scored his first league goal for Fulham on 13 September 2009 in a 2–1 victory over Everton, scoring in the 79th minute. On 19 December 2009, Duff scored in the 75th minute in a 3–0 victory over Manchester United. On 17 January 2010, Duff started the game against Blackburn Rovers at Ewood Park and also completed the full 90 minutes in a 2–0 defeat.

On 22 August 2010, he started and played the full 90 minutes against Manchester United at Craven Cottage in a 2–2 draw and also picked up a booking. On 18 September 2010, he started and played the entire match against Blackburn Rovers at Ewood Park in a 1–1 draw. On 15 January 2011, Duff made his 500th career appearance in English football when he lined up against Wigan Athletic playing the full 90 minutes in a 1–1 draw at the DW Stadium. On 5 February 2011, he started the Premier League game against Aston Villa in a 2–2 draw at Villa Park, but was replaced on 67 minutes by Simon Davies. On 27 February 2011, he played the full 90 minutes and also scored a goal in the match with Manchester City at Eastlands in a 1–1 draw.

On 5 March 2011, Duff scored a brace in a 3–2 win against former side Blackburn Rovers at Craven Cottage.
With the two goals, he continued a run of four goals in five matches.

About Fulham and his time at the football club, Duff stated: "I like to think that I have found my feet again here at Fulham. It's a good environment and one that players feel very comfortable in. This is a club with so much character and I'm very happy to be helping move it forward." At the end of the 2010–11 season, Duff made 27 appearances and scored 4 goals in all competitions, including making 24 Premier League appearances. On 19 August 2011, Duff signed a one-year extension to his current deal.

After nine goalless matches, Duff scored in Fulham's 2–1 win over Norwich City on 31 March 2012.
A week later, on 7 April 2012, he starred in Fulham's 0–3 away win over Bolton Wanderers, setting up Clint Dempsey for the second goal of the match. During the match, which marked his 350th league appearance, he was a constant threat on the right wing. On 18 August 2012, Duff scored the opening goal in Fulham's 5–0 win over Norwich City on the opening day of the 2012–13 Premier League. He scored again in the following game, a 3–2 defeat to Manchester United.

On 22 February 2013, Duff signed a new contract with Fulham, keeping him at the club until summer 2014. On 16 April 2014, Duff confirmed his intention to leave Fulham at the end of the 2013–14 season. Duff told The Irish Times,  "I'll be leaving Fulham. The club haven't spoken to me and I haven't spoken to the club but we don't need to speak." He was released from the club on 23 May.

Melbourne City 
In June 2014, Duff joined Australian A-League club Melbourne City as a free transfer in a one-year deal. Duff made his debut against Sydney FC on match day one, assisting David Villa for his first goal in the A-League. Duff scored his first goal against the Newcastle Jets in a 5–2 win. In March 2015, Duff confirmed that he would leave Melbourne City to return to his homeland, with the intention of finishing his career in the League of Ireland.

Shamrock Rovers
On 14 July 2015, Duff signed for League of Ireland Premier Division club Shamrock Rovers, and revealed he would be donating his wages to charity.  After nine games for the Dublin-based side, on 21 December 2015 he announced his retirement from football.

International career

Duff played for the Republic of Ireland national under-19 football team in the 1997 UEFA European Under-18 Football Championship finals in Iceland, the 1997 and 1999 FIFA World Youth Championship. In Malaysia, he scored the first ever Golden Goal in a World Cup match.

He made his senior début for the Republic of Ireland in 1998 against the Czech Republic. He won 100 caps, making him the fifth most capped player in Irish history. He started a total of 82 times for the Republic of Ireland senior squad, scoring eight goals.

He played every game for Republic of Ireland at the 2002 FIFA World Cup and was voted the team's player of the tournament. After scoring against Saudi Arabia, en route to the second round of the FIFA World Cup, Duff marked his goal with an oriental bow, in retrospect often referred to as one of the most memorable moments of his international career. He was named as the FAI Senior International Player of the Year in 2002.

After a poor campaign, failing to qualify and a change of managers during the qualifiers for UEFA Euro 2004, he still scored two goals during the qualifiers against Georgia and Russia.

He was ever present for the Republic of Ireland in their qualifying campaign for the 2006 FIFA World Cup, but yet again, they failed to qualify. Duff's former teammate Steve Staunton took over as manager but early defeats to Germany and a humiliating 5–2 loss to Cyprus saw the Irish fail to qualify again for a major tournament, followed by another change of manager.

Under the new manager Giovanni Trapattoni, Duff started the manager's first game in charge against Serbia on 24 May 2008, which ended in a 1–1 draw. Duff became a key member of the squad proving assists for many of the goals. He started the matches in both legs against France as the Irish were controversially knocked out 2–1 on aggregate after extra-time.

Duff was ever-present on the wings for the Republic of Ireland in their UEFA Euro 2012 qualifying campaign and he was part of the team that secured qualification for UEFA Euro 2012 with an unprecedented 5–1 aggregate play-off win over Estonia. He was named in Trapattoni's 23-man squad for UEFA Euro 2012 and was given the number 11 jersey. On 18 June 2012, he captained the Republic of Ireland on his 100th cap against Italy, their final group game of the tournament. This turned out to be the last match he played representing his country.

He announced his retirement from international football on 24 August 2012.

Coaching career
During his last playing season at Shamrock Rovers, Duff coached the club's under-15 team. On 16 April 2016, it was announced that he would take on a coaching role with the Republic of Ireland under-15s, in line with the recommendation from FAI High Performance Director, Ruud Dokter, that more ex-internationals get involved in coaching roles with the national team setup. On 31 July 2016, Duff joined the Shamrock Rovers first-team coaching staff until the end of the season, with the intention that he would then take control of the under-15 group he previously managed, then competing in the League of Ireland U17 Division.

Duff was appointed to a reserve team coaching position with Celtic in January 2019. When Neil Lennon became interim manager at Celtic in February 2019, Duff was promoted to first team coach, with John Kennedy promoted to assistant manager. After the club completed a third successive domestic treble, Lennon was made permanent manager, with Duff and Kennedy retaining their roles. Celtic secured a ninth league title in-a-row and fourth straight League Cup in 2019–20. On 5 April 2020, Duff was announced as the assistant manager of the Republic of Ireland senior team to Stephen Kenny, who replaced Mick McCarthy.  On 24 June 2020 it was announced that in conjunction with his role as assistant manager of the Republic of Ireland senior team, Duff would also become head coach of the under 17 team at League of Ireland club Shelbourne.  On 8 January 2021, Duff stepped down as Kenny's assistant.

Shelbourne
On 3 November 2021, Duff was appointed as the first team manager of League of Ireland Premier Division club, Shelbourne. His first match in senior management was a 3–0 loss at home to rivals St Patrick's Athletic on 18 February 2022.

Personal life
Duff was born in Ballyboden, County Dublin.

Duff married Elaine in June 2010 at Babington House near Midsomer Norton in Somerset. The couple's first child, Woody, was born a year later in the county. Duff is also a rugby fan, and is personally acquainted with some of Ireland's international rugby players.

According to the February 2009 issue of FourFourTwo magazine Duff was worth £14 million, placing him 92nd in the magazine's 2009 Football Rich List.

Duff was referenced in the song Summertime Shootout (featuring T-Pain) by AJ Tracey from his album Flu Game.

Media work
Duff was part of RTÉ Sport's coverage of UEFA Euro 2016,,UEFA Euro 2020 and FIFA World Cup 2022.

Career statistics

Club

International

Scores and results list Republic of Ireland's goal tally first, score column indicates score after each Duff goal.

Managerial

Honours

Player
Blackburn Rovers
Football League Cup: 2001–02

Chelsea
Premier League: 2004–05, 2005–06
Football League Cup: 2004–05
FA Community Shield: 2005

Newcastle United
UEFA Intertoto Cup: 2006

Fulham
UEFA Europa League runner-up: 2009–10

Republic of Ireland U20
FIFA World Youth Championship third place: 1997

Republic of Ireland
Nations Cup: 2011

Individual
FAI Senior International Player of the Year: 2002
PFA Team of the Year: 2000–01 First Division
UEFA Team of the Year: 2002

Manager
Shelbourne  
 FAI Cup
Runners up: 2022

See also
 List of footballers with 100 or more caps

References

External links 

 
 

1979 births
Living people
Sportspeople from South Dublin (county)
Republic of Ireland association footballers
Republic of Ireland youth international footballers
Republic of Ireland international footballers
Association football wingers
Republic of Ireland expatriate association footballers
Expatriate footballers in England
Blackburn Rovers F.C. players
Chelsea F.C. players
Newcastle United F.C. players
Fulham F.C. players
Expatriate soccer players in Australia
Irish expatriate sportspeople in Australia
Melbourne City FC players
Shamrock Rovers F.C. players
Premier League players
English Football League players
A-League Men players
2002 FIFA World Cup players
UEFA Euro 2012 players
FIFA Century Club
Leicester Celtic A.F.C. players
Celtic F.C. non-playing staff
People from Rathfarnham
St. Kevin's Boys F.C. players
Shelbourne F.C. managers